John MacIsaac may refer to:

 John A. MacIsaac (1883–1942), member of the Nova Scotia House of Assembly
 John L. MacIsaac (1870–1941), member of the Nova Scotia House of Assembly
 John MacIsaac (athlete), see 1958 European Athletics Championships – Men's 4 × 400 metres relay